Álvaro Corcoroca de Sousa (29 June 1879, Florianópolis – 1 August 1939, Florianópolis), or simply Álvaro Sousa, was a Brazilian music teacher, musician, and composer, whose father was José Brazilício de Souza (9 January 1854 – 30 March 1910), the composer of the Brazilian state anthem of Santa Catarina. He was the director of the band that he founded called Amor à Arte. As a music instructor, he also wrote books pertaining to training in music and music theories. Álvaro Sousa was the father of the composer, Abelardo Sousa (18 February 1920 – 27 May 1986).

Books
Compêndio Elementar de Música
Dó Sustenido não e Ré Bemol
Glossário de Termos Italianos Usados na Escrituração Musical
Nações de Harmonia

Compositions
A canção da arvore
Hino da Escola Normal Catarinense
Iris
Mikanol
Rapsódia catarinense

Notes

Further reading

References

External links
 

1879 births
1939 deaths
Brazilian composers
Musicians from Santa Catarina (state)
20th-century classical composers